Tortricosia excisa is a moth in the subfamily Arctiinae first described by George Hampson in 1900. It is found in Myanmar, Peninsular Malaysia and Borneo. The habitat consists of lowland forests, including heath forests and disturbed areas.

Description 
The species' general appearance is similar to Utriculofera fuscapex, though larger. The wings have a characteristic shape; the forewings range from brown to pale grey while the hindwings are usually darker.

References

Cisthenina